Bahari Racing was a NASCAR Winston Cup and Busch team that operated from 1981 to 2001.The Busch team ran from 1989-1996 with Ronnie Sliver and Michael Waltrip driving, and one race with Johnny Benson at Homestead. The team's history of drivers include Geoff Bodine, Michael Waltrip, Johnny Benson, Kenny Wallace, Jeff Fuller, Rick Mast, and Mike Bliss, among others.  The team mainly ran Pontiac Grand Prixs, although they did run other manufacturers as well. The team was also known as Bahre Racing and Bahari Racing prior to its purchase by Jack Birmingham in 1999, who renamed the team Eel River Racing. It was under that name that the team ceased operating in 2001.

Team history

Beginnings
The team originally started as the Bahre Racing No. 23 Pontiac owned by Dick Bahre in 1981.  The team ran part-time until 1986. Chuck Rider entered the fold in 1987.  The team at that point was renamed Bahari Racing, using the first two letters of each of the three principal owners' surnames (Dick BAhre, Lowrance HArry, & Chuck RIder).  Waltrip, who ran a few races in late 1985 for the team, ran for Rookie of the Year in 1986 in a car sponsored by Hawaiian Punch.

1987 saw the team switch numbers from 23 to 30 and manufacturers from Pontiac to Chevrolet.  Hawaiian Punch left the team, resulting in a revolving door of sponsors before All Pro Auto Parts came on for the rest of the season.

1988 saw the team switch back to Pontiac and acquire sponsorship from Country Time Lemonade.  Waltrip then proceeded to miss the field for the 1988 Daytona 500.  The team bought the Mueller Brothers' No. 89 entry and ran that car in the race to a 22nd-place finish.  The June race at Pocono saw Waltrip bring the No. 30 home in 2nd place, in addition to two other top-10 finishes that season.  1989 saw an additional five top-10s for the team, while 1990 (which saw Maxwell House join the team as a co-sponsor to Country Time) saw Waltrip pick up five top 5s and five more top-10s in addition.  However, at the end of the season, both Country Time and Maxwell House left the No. 30 for full-time sponsorships on other cars (the No. 68 for Tri-Star Motorsports and the new No. 22 for Junior Johnson Motorsports, respectively).

The Pennzoil Years
1991 saw Pennzoil brought in as the new sponsor for the team, and Waltrip responded with his best season to that point.  The No. 30 won poles at Dover and Michigan in June, the team's first two poles.  Waltrip also earned four top-5s and 12 top-10s for the team on his way to a 15th-place finish in points.

1992 began with Waltrip as one of three cars that had a chance to win the Daytona 500, but a blown engine in the last 10 laps relegated him to a disappointing 18th.  The rest of the year was disappointing as well, dropping to 23rd in points and recording a 4th at Rockingham as his best finish of the year.

1994 and 1995 were, based on the points standings, Michael Waltrip's two best seasons in the Cup series.  Waltrip drove the No. 30 to 12th in points (best among the Pontiacs) both years with nearly identical results.  However, after the season, Waltrip left the team to drive the No. 21 for the Wood Brothers.

For 1996, the team hired Johnny Benson, the 1995 Busch Series Champion to take over the No. 30.  Benson won the pole for the Purolator 500 at Atlanta in March, but struggled early on, even failing to qualify for the Food City 500 at Bristol.  Later on in the season, Benson's performances improved.  Benson had the lead late at Richmond in September before fading to 10th.  Benson ended the year 21st in points with a best finish of 5th at Pocono in July, in addition to winning the Rookie of the Year award.

1997 was the team's best season in the Winston Cup Series.  Benson finished 11th in points, just 1 point behind 10th place Ken Schrader.  During the season, Benson won the pole at Michigan and had 8 top-10 finishes.  However, Benson left the team to drive the new No. 26 for Roush Racing at the end of the season and Pennzoil left to sponsor the new No. 1 for Dale Earnhardt Inc.

Decline
For 1998, Derrike Cope was brought in to replace Benson behind the wheel. Gumout, a division of Pennzoil, provided the sponsorship for the team.  However, the season was a big letdown.  The team failed to score a top 10 finish for the first time since 1986 and failed to qualify for four races.  Cope also missed Martinsville due to injury and was replaced briefly by Jeff Green.  The high point for the team was the pole Cope won at Charlotte in October.  The best finish for the No. 30 was an 11th at Talladega.  In addition, the team fell all the way from 11th in 1997 to 40th in the owners' points standings.  Gumout left the team at the end of the season.

1999 saw the team acquire sponsorship from the Sara Lee Corporation.  Primary sponsorship would be split between four divisions- Jimmy Dean Sausages, Bryan Meats, State Fair Corn Dogs, and Rudy's Farm.  Each division had its own paint scheme.

The season was a complete disaster.  Cope failed to qualify for half of the first 22 races before the team was sold to Jack Birmingham and renamed Eel River Racing. He renamed it to Eel River Racing because of his native Massachusetts roots where the Eel River is in Plymouth, where Birmingham is from.  Birmingham fired Cope and replaced him with Todd Bodine.  Mike Bliss also ran two races in the No. 30 before the end of the season.

Eel River Racing
In 2000, the car number was changed from No. 30 to No. 27, and after Birmingham's purchase of the team, the team's best finish was a ninth-place run at Talladega on October 15, 2000 with Bliss. The team's only full season was in 2000, when Fuller and Bliss raced for the team. That year the team had 10 DNFs, and would struggle to reach the top-40 in points. After a long season, the team would end up 38th in driver's points.

After running the previous two seasons with sponsorship from Pfizer and its Viagra brand, Eel River Racing began the 2001 season with Kenny Wallace driving a largely unsponsored car. After running with one-off sponsorships for most of the early season races, the team eventually was able to secure sponsorship from C.F. Sauer, who joined the team for the Coca-Cola 600. The No. 27 was painted yellow and carried the logo of Sauer's Duke's Mayonnaise division.

Demise
The team failed to qualify for a race again until the Pennsylvania 500. Wallace had departed after missing the field at Sonoma, replaced by a returning Mike Bliss. Bliss failed to qualify at all and was replaced by Rick Mast at Pocono. After missing the Brickyard 400, Mast qualified for the next five races after that, ending with the Chevrolet Monte Carlo 400. Mast attempted to qualify for the remaining races in September, through the inaugural Winston Cup race at Kansas, but did not qualify there or at Dover (New Hampshire was postponed to November due to the September 11 attacks in New York). Sauer's and Mast left to prepared for the 2002 with Donlavey Racing, leaving Birmingham with no sponsor, no driver, and no choice but to suspend operations. The team officially closed their doors on October 2, 2001, 2 days after the race at Kansas.

Team Results

Car No. 27 results

References

External links
 
 
 

Defunct NASCAR teams
American auto racing teams
Auto racing teams established in 1981
Auto racing teams disestablished in 2001